Texas Star is a Ferris wheel at Fair Park in Dallas, Texas, where it operates during the annual State Fair of Texas as its most popular ride.

It can carry up to 264 passengers in its 44 gondolas. The view is one of the things that entice people to ride on it.

Built by SDC Corp. in Reggio Emilia, Italy, at a cost of $2.2 million, it was shipped to Dallas for its debut at the 1985 State Fair of Texas. It is owned by Barbara Brown and her brother Mike Sandefur.

From 1985 to 2007 it was illuminated at night by 16,000 incandescent red, white, and blue turbolites. In 2008, this system was replaced with a longer-lasting, more energy-efficient LED system.

References

Amusement rides introduced in 1985
Ferris wheels in the United States
State Fair of Texas
1985 establishments in Texas